Turbeville is an unincorporated community in Halifax County, Virginia, United States. It lies at an elevation of 535 feet (163 m).

References

Unincorporated communities in Halifax County, Virginia
Unincorporated communities in Virginia